Reuven Rubin (November 13, 1893 – October 13, 1974) was a Romanian-born Israeli painter and Israel's first ambassador to Romania.

Biography
Rubin Zelicovici (later Reuven Rubin) was born in Galaţi to a poor Romanian Jewish Hasidic family. He was the eighth of 13 children. In 1912, he left for Ottoman-ruled Palestine to study art at Bezalel Academy of Art and Design in Jerusalem. Finding himself at odds with the artistic views of the Academy's teachers, he left for Paris, France, in 1913 to pursue his studies at the École Nationale Supérieure des Beaux-Arts. At the outbreak of World War I, he returned to Romania to the city of Falticeni, where he spent the war years.

In 1921, he traveled to the United States with his friend and fellow artist, Arthur Kolnik, with whom he had shared a studio in Cernăuţi. In New York City, the two met artist Alfred Stieglitz, who was instrumental in organizing their first American show at the Anderson Gallery. Following the exhibition, in 1922, they both returned to Europe. In 1923, Rubin emigrated to Mandate Palestine.

Rubin met his wife, Esther, in 1928, aboard a passenger ship to Palestine on his return from a show in New York City. She was a Bronx girl who had won a trip to Palestine in a Young Judea competition.

Artistic career

The history of Israeli art began at a very specific moment in the history of international art, at a time of Cezannian rebellion against the conventions of the past, a time typified by rapid stylistic changes. Thus Jewish national art had no fixed history, no canon to obey. Rubin began his career at a fortunate time.

The painters who depicted the country’s landscapes in the 1920s rebelled against Bezalel. They sought current styles in Europe that would help portray their own country’s landscape, in keeping with the spirit of the time. Rubin’s Cezannesque landscapes from the 1920s were defined by both a modern and a naive style, portraying the landscape and inhabitants of Israel in a sensitive fashion. His landscape paintings in particular paid special detail to a spiritual, translucent light.

In Palestine, he became one of the founders of the new Eretz-Yisrael style. Recurring themes in his work were the biblical landscape, folklore and people, including Yemenite, Hasidic Jews and Arabs. Many of his paintings are sun-bathed depictions of Jerusalem and the Galilee. Rubin might have been influenced by the work of Henri Rousseau whose style combined with Eastern nuances, as well as with the neo-Byzantine art to which Rubin had been exposed in his native Romania. In accordance with his integrative style, he signed his works with his first name in Hebrew and his surname in Roman letters.

In 1924, he was the first artist to hold a solo exhibition at the Tower of David, in Jerusalem (later exhibited in Tel Aviv at Gymnasia Herzliya). That year he was elected chairman of the Association of Painters and Sculptors of Palestine. From the 1930s onwards, Rubin designed backdrops for Habima Theater, the Ohel Theater and other theaters.

His autobiography, published in 1969, is titled My Life - My Art. He died in Tel Aviv in October 1974, after having bequeathed his home on 14 Bialik Street and a core collection of his paintings to the city of Tel Aviv. The Rubin Museum opened in 1983. The director and curator of the museum is his daughter-in-law, Carmela Rubin.
Rubin's paintings are now increasingly sought after. At a Sotheby's auction in New York City in 2007, his work accounted for six of the ten top lots.

Diplomatic career
In 1948, he became the first official Israeli diplomatic envoy (minister) to Romania. He served in this position until 1950.

Gallery

Education
 1912 Bezalel Academy of Arts and Design, Jerusalem
 1913-14 École des Beaux Arts, Paris and Académie Colarossi, Paris

Awards and commemoration
 1926 Awarded the Lord Plumer Prize
 1945 Receives Honorary Doctorate of Hebrew Letters, Jewish Institute of Religion, New York
 1964, Rubin received an "honorary award" of the Dizengoff Prize for Painting.
 1971 Awarded the "Artist of the year", University of Judaism, Los Angeles
 1973, he was awarded the Israel Prize, for painting.

See also
List of Israel Prize recipients
Highest price for Rubin's work ever in Israel "Shaykh-Munis" sold for 529,000$ at Tiroche auction house, 2011

References

Bibliography
 Dalia Manor, "The Dancing Jew and Other Characters: Art in the Jewish Settlement of Palestine during the 1920s", Journal of Modern Jewish Studies, 1(1), 2002, pp. 73–89.
 Dalia Manor, "Imagined Homeland: Landscape Painting in Palestine in the 1920s", Nations and Nationalism, 9 (4), 2003, pp. 533–554.
 Dalia Manor, 'Art in Zion: The Genesis of Modern National Art in Jewish Palestine, London & New York, Routledge, 2005, esp. chapters 6, 7.
 Claus Stephani: Das Bild des Juden in der modernen Malerei. Eine Einführung. / Imaginea evreului în pictura modernă. Studiu introductiv. (Zweisprachige Ausgabe, deutsch-rumänisch. Ediţie bilingvă, româno-germană.) Editura Hasefer: Bucharest, 2005.

External links
 
 
 
 Rubin Museum
 Reuven Rubin Catalogue Raisonne Project
 Rubin at the Art Cyclopaedia
 Reuven Rubin's "Goldfish Vendor" by Carmela Rubin
 Reuven Rubin from the Jewish Virtual Library

1893 births
1974 deaths
People from Galați
Romanian Jews
Israeli people of Romanian-Jewish descent
Romanian emigrants to Israel
Ashkenazi Jews in Ottoman Palestine
Ashkenazi Jews in Mandatory Palestine
Israeli male painters
Israeli scenic designers
Israeli diplomats
Israeli Ashkenazi Jews
Romanian scenic designers
Jewish painters
Israel Prize in painting recipients
20th-century Israeli male artists
20th-century Israeli painters
Académie Colarossi alumni
Ambassadors of Israel to Romania
Burials at Trumpeldor Cemetery